Hopewell is a former unincorporated community in Daviess County, Missouri, United States.

References

Former populated places in Daviess County, Missouri
Ghost towns in Missouri